Richard Martín González Lamas (born 3 June 1994) is an Uruguayan professional footballer who plays for Cerro, as a defender.

Career
González has played for Canadian, Rentistas, Fénix, Liverpool (URU) and Cerro.

References

1994 births
Living people
Uruguayan footballers
Canadian Soccer Club players
C.A. Rentistas players
Centro Atlético Fénix players
Liverpool F.C. (Montevideo) players
C.A. Cerro players
Uruguayan Segunda División players
Uruguayan Primera División players
Association football defenders